Many notable people have had post-traumatic stress disorder, or PTSD. This is a list of people with verifiable sources confirming that they struggled with PTSD. In the case of historical figures, retrospective diagnoses are only included when mainstream, expert sources indicate that they probably had the disorder.

PTSD is a mental disorder which develops in the aftermath of a traumatic event, such as witnessing or experiencing warfare, sexual assault, child abuse, domestic abuse, genocide, natural disasters, traffic collisions, and so on. Not everyone who experiences trauma will develop PTSD. Symptoms include flashbacks, nightmares, increased fight-or-flight response, mental and physical distress when reminded of the trauma, efforts to avoid traumatic memories or reminders of the trauma, forgetting parts of the traumatic event(s), negative beliefs about oneself and/or the world, reckless behavior, problems sleeping, irritability, negative emotional state, a feeling of being detached from others, blaming oneself for the trauma, and an inability to experience happiness or pleasure. Women are more likely to have PTSD than men.



A

 

 Anthony Acevedo (1924—2018), Mexican-American soldier in WWII
 Agar Adamson (1865—1929), Canadian soldier
 Lily Allen (1985–), British singer
 Denis Avey (1919—2015), British soldier and POW

B
 Mel B (1975–), English singer-songwriter
 Kelsea Ballerini (1993–), American singer
 Mischa Barton (1986–), British-American actor
 Derek Bell (1963–), English footballer
 Donald Bolduc (1961 or 1962–), American politician
 Kate Bornstein (1948–), American performance artist and writer
 Abigail Breslin (1996–), American actor and singer
 Jasper Brett (1895–1917), Irish rugby player
 Kylar Broadus (1963—), American attorney
 Joseph Brodak, American bank robber
 Chris Brown (1989—), American singer-songwriter
 Damien Brown (1984—), Australian mixed martial artist
 Nish Bruce (1956–2002), British Army soldier and skydiver
 Germán Busch (1903—1939), Bolivian military officer and 36th president of Bolivia

C
 Pedro Cano (1920—1952), Mexican-American soldier in WWII
 Joseph Cao (1967—), Vietnamese-American politician
 Lynda Cash (1949 or 1950—), British Royal Navy sailor
 William H. Christian (1825–1887), American Brigadier General during the Civil War
Circuit Des Yeux (1988—), American vocalist, composer, and singer-songwriter
 Daisy Coleman (1997–2020), American activist for sexual assault victims
 Kayden Coleman (1986—), American social media influencer and transgender rights advocate
 Roger Cooper, British businessman
 Leela Corman (1972—), American cartoonist
 Charly Cox (1995—), British mental health activist
 Chris Cramer (1948–2021), British news journalist and executive
 James Credle (1945–), American activist for veterans and LGBT people

D
 Roméo Dallaire (1946–), Canadian humanitarian and politician
 Tony Dell (1945–), Australian cricketer
 Norbert Denef (1949—), German advocate against sex abuse in the Roman Catholic church
 Beth Dobbin (1994—), Scottish sprinter
 Mark L. Donald (1967—), American Navy SEAL
 Taylor Dumpson (1995 or 1996—), American attorney.
 Alastair Duncan (1952—2016), British Army officer

E
 Lynndie England (1982–), American war criminal who participated in the Abu Ghraib torture and prisoner abuse
 Rubén Espinosa (1983—2015), Mexican photographer and journalist
 Sara Evans (1971–), American singer-songwriter

F
 George Farmer, British acuascaper
 Luis Fonseca, American Navy hospital corpsman
Stephanie Foo (1987—), Malaysian-American radio journalist and author
 Reginald Foresythe (1907—1958), British jazz pianist and composer
 Kelly Fraser (1993–2019), Canadian Inuk singer

G
 Catherine Galliford (1966 or 1967—), Canadian RCMP corporal
 Lorena Gallo (1969–), American domestic violence victim advocate acquitted of cutting off her husband's penis
 Jimmy Galt (1885–1935), Scottish footballer
 U Gambira (1979–), Burmese activist and former Buddhist monk 
 Abbie Gardner-Sharp (1843—1921), American kidnapping survivor who wrote a memoir about her experience
Connie Glynn (1994—), English Internet personality
 Whoopi Goldberg (1955–), American actor, comedian, and author
 Ariana Grande (1993–), American singer-songwriter
 Robert Graves (1895–1985), British poet, novelist, and critic
 Dror Green (1954—), Israeli-Bulgarian writer
 Matt Gresham, Australian singer-songwriter

H
 Darrell Hammond (1955–), American comedian and actor
 David Haigh, British lawyer
 Craig Harrison (1974–), British sniper
 Angel Haze (1991–), American rapper and singer
 Zoe Helene (1964—), American ecofeminist and advocate of psychedelic drugs
 Carle Hessay (1911—1978), German-Canadian painter
 David Hogg (2000–), American gun control activist
 Jose L. Holguin (1921–1994), American WWII veteran
 Mandy Horvath (1993—), American mountaineer
 Francine Hughes (1947–2017), American woman acquitted of murdering her abusive husband (battered woman syndrome)

I

J
 Harry Jackson (1924—2011), American artist
 Paris Jackson (1998–), American model, actor, singer, and musician
 Oliver Jackson-Cohen (1986–), English actor From 2013 to 2018,
 Jameela Jamil (1986–), English actor and activist
 Abd Al Rahim Abdul Rassak Janko (1977—), Kurdish man detained at Guantanamo
 Daniel Johns (1979–), Australian musician and singer-songwriter
 Dwight H. Johnson (1947–1971), American veteran who received the Medal of Honor

K
 Jason Kander (1981–), American attorney and politician
 Shalini Kantayya, filmmaker and environmental activist
 Fergal Keane (1961–), Irish journalist
 Andrea Kelly (1974–), American choreographer, dancer, and actor
 Jacqueline Kennedy (1929–1994), American socialite and first lady
 Sue Klebold (1949–), American author and activist
 Keira Knightley (1985–), English actor
 Alicia Kozakiewicz (1988–), American motivational speaker and missing persons advocate

L
 Shia LaBeouf (1986–), American actor
 Lady Gaga (1986–), American singer-songwriter and actor
 Erika Renee Land (1983—), American writer
 Ernie LaPointe (1948–), Lakota author
 Percival Lancaster (1880–1937), British civil engineer and writer
 Janet Leach, English social worker
 Left at London (1996–), American singer-songwriter
 Robin Lehner (1991–), Swedish ice hockey player
 Primo Levi (1919—1987), Italian Jewish chemist and writer
 Lisa-Jayne Lewis, British broadcaster
 Lawrence Lindell (1988—), American cartoonist
 Linda Lovelace (1949–2002), American pornographic actor who became an anti-pornography activist later in life

M
 Clint Malarchuk (1961–), Canadian ice hockey player
 Gabriel Mac, American author and journalist
 Neil Mackay, Northern Irish journalist, author, and filmmaker
 Aimee Mann (1960–), American singer-songwriter
 Catherine Mardon, Canadian writer and activist
 Hans-Joachim Marseille (1919—1942), German Luftwaffe fighter pilot
 Robert Mason (1942—), American veteran and author
 AnnaLynne McCord (1987–), American actor, model, and activist
 David McBride (1963–), Australian soldier and whistleblower who leaked evidence of Australian war crimes during the War in Afghanistan
 John McGavock Grider (1893—1918), American fighter pilot in WWI
 Ronnie McNutt (1987–2020), American man who committed suicide on a Facebook livestream
 Thomas Melville Lunan (1878—?), Scottish architect
 James Blake Miller (1984–), American marine who fought in the Iraq War
Joseph Daniel Miller (1964—), American serial killer (according to defense attorney)
 Sharee Miller (1971—), American criminal
 Walter M. Miller Jr. (1923–1996), American science fiction writer
 Luis Carlos Montalvan (1973–2016), American soldier and writer
 Devin Moore (1985–), American murderer
 David Morgan (1947—), British Navy and RAF pilot
 Philip Morris, English kidnapping victim
 Seth Moulton (1978–), American politician
 Benedict Joseph Murdoch (1886—1973), Canadian priest and writer
 Audie Murphy (1925–1971), American actor, soldier, and songwriter

N
 Joseph B. Noil (1841—1882), Canadian-American Navy sailor
 Brandy Norwood (1979–), American singer-songwriter, record producer, and model

O
 Llew O'Brien (1972—), Australian politician
 Rasmea Odeh (1947 or 1948—), Palestinian-Jordanian implicated in the 1969 PFLP bombings in Jerusalem
 Chris Opie (1987—), British cyclist
 Wilfred Owen (1893–1918), English poet and soldier
 Alex Owumi (1984—), Nigerian-American basketball player

P
José Padilla (1970—), American criminal
 Robert Park, American missionary and activist
 Rosie Perez (1964–), American actor, choreographer, and dancer
 Georg-Andreas Pogany (1971–), German-American soldier and activist
 Noa Pothoven (2001–2019), Dutch activist and author

Q
 Ali Shallal al-Qaisi (1962–), Iraqi detained and tortured in Abu Ghraib prison during American occupation

R
 James Rhodes (1975—), British-Spanish pianist and writer
 Emma Roddick (1997—), Scottish politician
 Michele Ross (1982—), American neuroscientist, author, and media personality

S
 J. D. Salinger (1919–2010), American writer
 Ahmad Naser Sarmast, Afghan-Australian ethnomusicologist
 Siegfried Sassoon (1886–1967), English war poet and writer
 Janina Scarlet (1983—), Ukrainian-American Jewish author and psychologist
 Sia (1975–), Australian singer-songwriter
 Jan Scruggs (1950—), American veteran of the Vietnam War and founder of a nonprofit
 Geoff Shaw, Australian Aboriginal (Arrernte/Kaytetye) community leader
 Paul Shuey (1970—), American baseball player
 Sadhvi Siddhali Shree, American activist
 Lodune Sincaid (1973—2019), American mixed martial artist
 Gail Sheehy (1936—2020), American author, journalist, and lecturer
 Emma Slade (1966—), British public speaker
 Dr. Charles Smith (1940—), American sculptor and minister
 Merriman Smith (1913—1970), American journalist
 Soghoman Soghomian (1869—1935), commonly known as Komitas; Ottoman Armenian priest, musician, and musicologist who survived the Armenian genocide
 Daniel Somers (1983—2013), American soldier in the Iraq War whose suicide note went viral
 Junior J. Spurrier (1922—1984), American veteran of WWII
 Hans-Arnold Stahlschmidt (1920—1942), German Luftwaffe pilot
 Alexandra Stan (1989—), Romanian singer-songwriter
 Stefan Steć (1964—2005), Polish UN peacekeeper
 Heinrich Stegemann (1888—1945), German painter and sculptor
 James Stephanie Sterling (1984–), English-American YouTuber and wrestler
 Dorothy Still Danner (1914—2001), American Navy nurse in WWII
 Julius Strauss, British journalist and wilderness guide
Erica Sullivan (2000—), Olympic swimmer representing the USA
 Charles Sumner (1811—1874), American politician
 Anthony Swofford (1970–), American writer

T
 Jack Hendrick Taylor (1909—1959), American Navy officer and concentration camp survivor
 Claude AnShin Thomas (1947—), American Zen Buddhist monk and Vietnam War veteran
 Hugh Thompson Jr. (1943—2006), American army major credited with ending the Mỹ Lai massacre
 Gunvald Tomstad (1918—1970), Norwegian resistance member during WWII
 Mary L. Trump (1965–), American psychologist and author
 Houston Tumlin (1992–2021), American actor

U

V
 Rachelle Vinberg (1998–), American skateboarder and actor

W
 Sam Wadsworth (1896–1961), English footballer
 Nico Walker (1985–), American writer
John Walsh, American politician
 Massey Whiteknife, Canadian businessperson and producer
 Lucy Wicks (1973—), Australian politician
 Denis Wigan (1893–1958), English cricketer
 Tom Wills (1835—1880), Australian sportsman
 Ron Wilson (1954—), Northern Irish-Australian TV and radio news presenter
 Alex Winter (1965–), British-American actor and filmmaker
 Bogdan-Dawid Wojdowski (1930—1994), Polish Jewish writer
 Brianna Wu (1971–), American video game developer and computer programmer

X

Y
 Will Young (1979–), British singer-songwriter and actor
 Tiffany Yu (1988–), American entrepreneur and activist

Z
 Keith Zettlemoyer (1955—1995), American murderer

See also 
 List of people with bipolar disorder
 List of people with schizophrenia
 List of people with an anxiety disorder

References 

Post-traumatic stress disorder
Lists of people with disabilities